Cold Springs (formerly, Cold Spring) is a census-designated place in El Dorado County, California. It has a population of 446.

A post office operated at Cold Spring (as it was then called) from in or before 1852 to 1874.

Demographics
The 2010 United States Census reported that Cold Springs had a population of 446. The racial makeup of Cold Springs was 413 (92.6%) White, 4 (0.9%) African American, 5 (1.1%) Native American, 3 (0.7%) Asian, 0 (0.0%) Pacific Islander, 15 (3.4%) from other races, and 6 (1.3%) from two or more races. Hispanic or Latino of any race were 43 persons (9.6%).

The Census reported that 446 people (100% of the population) lived in households, 0 (0%) lived in non-institutionalized group quarters, and 0 (0%) were institutionalized.

There were 196 households, out of which 43 (21.9%) had children under the age of 18 living in them, 103 (52.6%) were opposite-sex married couples living together, 19 (9.7%) had a female householder with no husband present, 9 (4.6%) had a male householder with no wife present.  There were 5 (2.6%) unmarried opposite-sex partnerships, and 1 (0.5%) same-sex married couples or partnerships. 56 households (28.6%) were made up of individuals, and 39 (19.9%) had someone living alone who was 65 years of age or older. The average household size was 2.28.  There were 131 families (66.8% of all households); the average family size was 2.76.

The population was spread out, with 80 people (17.9%) under the age of 18, 23 people (5.2%) aged 18 to 24, 64 people (14.3%) aged 25 to 44, 150 people (33.6%) aged 45 to 64, and 129 people (28.9%) who were 65 years of age or older.  The median age was 53.1 years. For every 100 females, there were 100.9 males.  For every 100 females age 18 and over, there were 104.5 males.

The homeowner vacancy rate was 1.2%; the rental vacancy rate was 11.1%.  376 people (84.3% of the population) lived in owner-occupied housing units and 70 people (15.7%) lived in rental housing units.

References

Census-designated places in El Dorado County, California
Populated places established in 1852
Census-designated places in California
1852 establishments in California